Alexis "Alex" Rhodes (born 1 December 1984) is an Australian professional racing cyclist.

On 18 July 2005, Rhodes suffered major trauma when a car drove into a training squad of Australian cyclists training near Zeulenroda, Germany, killing her teammate Amy Gillett.

Career highlights 

2002
1st Pursuit, UCI Track World Championships – Juniors
2004
1st Points race, World Cup, Sydney
3rd Pursuit, World Cup, Sydney
2005
2nd Points race, World Cup, Los Angeles
3rd Points race, World Cup, Manchester
3rd Pursuit, Australian National Track Championships, Adelaide
2006
1st Stage 3 Bay Classic, Geelong Ritchie Boulevard
3rd Pursuit, Australian National Track Championships, Adelaide
3rd Points race, Australian National Track Championships, Adelaide
2007
1st Stage 3 Bay Classic, Ritchie Boulevard
1st Stage 4 Bay Classic, Geelong Botanic Gardens
2008
1st Stage 1 Bay Classic
3rd Australian National Time Trial Championships, Ballarat
2012
 2nd Team time trial, 2012 UCI Road World Championships

References

External links 
 
 
Alex Rhodes profile at GreenEDGE Cycling website
 2005 cyclingnews.com interview with the survivors of the accident

1984 births
Living people
Australian female cyclists
Australian track cyclists
Cyclists at the 2006 Commonwealth Games
People from Alice Springs
Sportswomen from the Northern Territory
Australian Institute of Sport cyclists
Cyclists at the 2010 Commonwealth Games
Commonwealth Games competitors for Australia
20th-century Australian women
21st-century Australian women